The Nyhamna Gas Plant is a large and significant natural-gas processing plant in Aukra, Møre og Romsdal, Norway. As of January 2018, Norway was the world's third-largest natural gas exporter, after Russia and Qatar.

History
The gas plant was built for the Ormen Lange gas field, named after a ship of a Viking king. The head of the Ormen Lange project was Tom Rotjer. The site was built by Norsk Hydro, with partnership with Royal Dutch Shell, ExxonMobil and Petoro which is owned by the Norwegian government. When being built, the plant was Norway's largest construction project.

In 2005, Norway supplied 15% of the UK's natural gas. Once the gas plant was up and running, 20% of the UK's gas was coming from the Langeled pipeline.  It supplies heat to around 10 million British people.

Shell took over as operator on 1 December 2007.

Statnett built a 180 MW gas power plant in 2008, but it only operated 400 hours in 10 years, and was put up for sale.

Operation
It is situated near Gossa (island) at Nyhamna. Nyhamna has about 3,000 residents.

Langeled pipeline
The Langeled pipeline was built for Norsk Hydro, to begin operation in 2007, via the Sleipner gas field; as it passes through the Sleipner field, it is possible for this gas to be diverted to other countries. The pipeline travels an incredible 745 miles (1,200 km) to the Easington Gas Terminal in Yorkshire, England. The pipeline was built around the clock, 24 hours a day, with the pipeline sections being welded on Acergy's construction ship LB200; it could lay about 4 km a day. It required 1.2 million tonnes of steel. Langeled was the responsibility of Statoil. The pipeline sections for the southern section were assembled at the Bredero Shaw site in Farsund in Southern Norway (Sørlandet). The northern section was assembled at Måløy in Western Norway, and the middle sections were assembled at Sotra in Western Norway.

From Nyhamna to Sleipner, the pipeline is 42 inches diameter, and from Sleipner to Easington it is 44 inches diameter. The section from Sleipner to Easington became operational on Sunday 1 October 2006. The project for the pipeline had begun in October 2004.

Gas fields

Ormen Lange
Ormen Lange is around 65 miles west of the gas plant. The field was discovered by Norsk Hydro in 1997. The wells were drilled by the ship West Navigator. The operation of Ormen Lange was owned 18% by Norsk Hydro, 17% by Norske Shell, 36% by Petoro, 10% by Statoil, 10% by Dansk Olie og Naturgas, and 7% by ExxonMobil (Esso). Ormen Lange is Norway's second largest gas field.

See also

 Energy in Norway

References

External links
 Norske Shell
 Nyhamna Expansion Project

2007 establishments in Norway
Buildings and structures in Møre og Romsdal
Chemical plants in Norway
Energy infrastructure completed in 2007
Natural gas infrastructure in Norway
Natural gas plants
Norsk Hydro
Shell plc buildings and structures